Womblife is an album by American fingerstyle guitarist and composer John Fahey, released in 1997. It was one of three releases by Fahey that year.

History 
Womblife continues John Fahey's career resurgence, again bearing minimal resemblance to his earliest work. It incorporates sound collages and experimental music.

Working with Jim O’Rourke, Fahey taped Womblife in the younger musician’s bedroom. O'Rourke has been long associated with the experimental and improv scene, frequently citing Fahey as an influence on his work. Echo, loops and samples along with guitar are used in musique concrète, a style Fahey used as far back as 1968's Requia. O'Rourke plays guitar on "Juana".

Reception 

Womblife was one of three releases by John Fahey in 1997. All three (including the album City of Refuge and the EP The Mill Pond) were experimental and avant-garde and were unexpected by his long-time fan base.
Music critic Brian Olewnick of Allmusic highly recommended the release, started his review with "This is not your father's John Fahey.", calling it "...one of the more overtly experimental albums in the Fahey catalog and also one of the most fascinatingly beautiful." Steve Taylor of Hollow Ear said of it, "This is one of the most dangerous sounding acoustic guitar recordings you are likely to encounter" and "the sound of it is cold, dark and hellish.", "raw and unpleasantly intoxicating". Both critics cite "Juana" as a more conventional track.

Richard Gehr referred to it as "echoing", an ".. innovative electric album...". Stewart Voegtlin of Stylus Magazine called it "... a complex record that marries musique concrete to bottleneck blues. It doesn’t always work: one often strains to hear the guitar over the invasive din."

Reissues 
All of Womblife was reissued on the Table of the Elements 2006 compilation release Sea Changes & Coelacanths: A Young Person's Guide to John Fahey.

Track listing
All songs by John Fahey.
 "Sharks" – 9:20
 "Planaria" – 9:54
 "Eels" – 6:13
 "Coelacanths" – 7:28
 "Juana" – 12:34

Personnel
John Fahey – guitar, tapes
Jim O'Rourke – guitar on "Juana"
Production notes:
Jim O'Rourke – producer
Jeff Hunt – artwork, design
Susan Archie – artwork
Bettina Herzner – photography

References

External links
Of Rivers and Revision: John Fahey and Cul de Sac

1997 albums
John Fahey (musician) albums
Albums produced by John Fahey (musician)